The Departmental Council of Rhône is the deliberative assembly of the French department of Rhône. Composed of 26 councilors, it is headquartered in Lyon.

Executive

President 
On April 2, 2015, the departmental councilor of the canton of Brignais, Christophe Guilloteau, was elected president of the departmental council, winning against Danielle Chuzeville, who chaired the Rhône General Council since January 21, 2013. He was re-elected as the president on July 1, 2021.

Vice-presidents

References 

Rhône
Auvergne-Rhône-Alpes